The Sentimental Bloke is a 1963 Australian television film. It was a half-hour ballet aired on ABC.  It is based on the poem, The Songs of a Sentimental Bloke by C. J. Dennis.

A copy of the telecast is held by the National Film and Sound Archive, despite having aired in an era where wiping was common. It was recorded at ABC's studios in Southbank.

Cast
Jack Manuel as The Bloke
Carolyn Harrison as Doreen
Maxwell Collis as Stror 'at Coot

References

External links
The Sentimental Bloke on IMDb

1963 television films
Australian television films
Australian Broadcasting Corporation original programming
Black-and-white Australian television shows
1963 films